The Sognefjellsvegen or Sognefjellsveien is the highest mountain pass road in Northern Europe. Part of County Road 55, it is located in Innlandet and Vestland counties in Norway. It is a national tourist road and starts in the village of Lom in the municipality of Lom, it then travels over the Sognefjell mountain area, and it ends in the village of Gaupne in the municipality of Luster. The road was opened on 16 July 1938. The road passes through the Jotunheimen, Hurrungane, and Breheimen mountains. During the winters there is a lot of snow, and so the road is closed from November through May. The road passes between Jotunheimen National Park and Breheimen National Park.

Route
The road passes the villages of Galdesanden, Spiterstulen, and Elveseter, then the mountain Galdhøpiggen, lake Bøvertunvatnet, and then the Bøvertun rest area.  The rest areas of Krossbu and Sognefjellshytta are located beside the road high up in the mountains.  Upon entering Luster, the road passes the lakes Prestesteinsvatnet and Hervavatnet with the mountain Fannaråki, just south of the road. Descending into the valley, the road passes the hotel Turtagrø, the villages of Skjolden, Luster, Høyheimsvik, and Nes before finally reaching Gaupne which is along the Sognefjord.

See also
List of highest paved roads in Europe
List of mountain passes

References

External links

Sognefjellsvegen information
Sognefjellsvegen 
Pictures of the route

Landforms of Vestland
Landforms of Innlandet
Luster, Norway
Lom, Norway
Mountain passes of Norway
National Tourist Routes in Norway